Denmark was represented by Birgit Brüel, with the song "For din skyld", at the 1965 Eurovision Song Contest, which took place on 5 March in Naples, Italy.

Before Eurovision

Dansk Melodi Grand Prix 1965 
The final was held at the Studio 2 of Radiohusets in Copenhagen on 18 February 1965. The competition was held internally, and was not transmitted on television.

At Eurovision
On the night of the final Brüel performed 14th in the running order, following Italy and preceding eventual contest winners Luxembourg. In what is often considered the first contest in which a majority of the participants had attempted to submit songs in a style which could pass for contemporary music, "For din skyld" was conspicuous as an exceptionally plain, old-fashioned ballad. However, to the surprise of many, the song picked up two maximum 5 points votes from Luxembourg and Sweden, enough to place Denmark 7th of the 18 entries. The Danish jury awarded its 5 points to the United Kingdom.

Voting

References 

1965
Countries in the Eurovision Song Contest 1965
Eurovision